Gavin Exell (born 16 October 1962) is a former Australian rules footballer who played with Geelong and Fitzroy in the VFL/AFL.

Exell started his career at Carlton where he played reserves football but after being unable to break into the seniors he joined Geelong. In 1989 he kicked a career high 63 goals which topped Geelong's goalkicking in the home and away season but injury prevented him from lining up in the Grand Final. His best individual haul that year was nine goals in a shootout against Hawthorn at Princes Park where Geelong, despite scoring 163 points, lost the game. He kicked another eight the following week against St Kilda.

Fitzroy acquired his services for the 1992 AFL season but he could only manage five games for his new club.

He later played for Stanhope in the Kyabram & District Football League and was the competition's leading goal-kicker in 2000, 2001 and 2003 with over 100 goals each year.

References
Holmesby, Russell and Main, Jim (2007). The Encyclopedia of AFL Footballers. 7th ed. Melbourne: Bas Publishing.

External links

1962 births
Living people
Australian rules footballers from Victoria (Australia)
Geelong Football Club players
Fitzroy Football Club players
Sandhurst Football Club players